is the seventh single of Morning Musume subgroup Tanpopo. It was released on November 21, 2001. The single peaked at #1 on the Oricon weekly charts, selling 129,980 copies in its first week, 201,040 copies overall, and charted for seven weeks.

The songs "Ōjisama to Yuki no Yoru" and "Nenmatsu Nenshi no Dai Keikaku" from this single are featured on the album All of Tanpopo. "Ōjisama to Yuki no Yoru" is the third track on the disc while "Nenmatsu Nenshi no Dai Keikaku" is the twelfth.

Members at the time of single
Kaori Iida
Mari Yaguchi
Rika Ishikawa
Ai Kago

Track listing

References

External links 
Koi o Shichaimashita! Up-Front Works

2001 singles
Tanpopo songs
Japanese-language songs
Oricon Weekly number-one singles
Songs written by Tsunku
Song recordings produced by Tsunku
2001 songs